TEKO TV was the first private television operator in the Republic of Macedonia (and also in the former Yugoslavia).  Founded in 1989 in Štip by Mile Kokotov, it is not operational anymore.

Television channels in North Macedonia
Television channels and stations established in 1989
Mass media in Štip